Michael George Francis Ventris,  (12 July 1922 – 6 September 1956) was an English architect, classicist and philologist who deciphered Linear B, the ancient Mycenaean Greek script. A student of languages, Ventris had pursued decipherment as a personal vocation since his adolescence. After creating a new field of study, Ventris died in a car crash a few weeks before the publication of Documents in Mycenaean Greek, written with John Chadwick.

Early life and education
Ventris was born into a traditional army family. His grandfather, Francis Ventris, was a major-general and Commander of British Forces in China. His father, Edward Francis Vereker Ventris, was a lieutenant-colonel in the Indian Army, who retired early due to ill health. Edward Ventris married Anna Dorothea (Dora) Janasz, who was from a wealthy Jewish and Polish paternal background. Michael Ventris was their only child.

The family moved to Switzerland for eight years, seeking a healthy environment for Colonel Ventris. Young Michael started school in Gstaad, where classes were taught in French and German. He soon was fluent in both languages and showing proficiency for Swiss German. He was capable of learning a language within a matter of weeks, which allowed him to acquire fluency in a dozen languages. His mother often spoke Polish to him, and he was fluent by the age of eight. At this time, he was reading Adolf Erman's Die Hieroglyphen in German.

In 1931, the Ventris family returned home. From 1931 to 1935 Ventris was sent to Bickley Hill School in Stowe. His parents divorced in 1935. At this time, he secured a scholarship to Stowe School. At Stowe he learned some Latin and Ancient Greek. He did not do outstanding work there – by then he was spending most of his spare time learning as much as he could about Linear B, some of his study time being spent under the covers at night with a torch. When he was not boarding at school, Ventris lived with his mother, before 1935 in coastal hotels, and then in the avant garde Berthold Lubetkin's Highpoint modernist apartments in Highgate, London. His mother's acquaintances, who frequented the house, included many sculptors, painters, and writers of the day. The flat was furnished with the works of Marcel Breuer. The money for her artistic patronage came from Polish estates.

Young adult
Ventris's father died in 1938 and his mother Dora became administrator of the estate. With the German invasion of Poland in 1939, Mrs Ventris lost her private income, and in 1940 Dora's father died. Ventris lost his mother to clinical depression and an overdose of barbiturates. He never spoke of her, assuming instead an ebullient and energetic manner in whatever he decided to do, a trait which won him numerous friends. 

A friend of the family, Russian sculptor Naum Gabo, took Ventris under his wing. Ventris later said that Gabo was the most family he had ever had. It may have been at Gabo's house that he began the study of Russian.  

He decided on architecture as a career, and enrolled in the Architectural Association School of Architecture. There he met his wife-to-be Lois Knox-Niven, known as Betty, daughter of pilot Lois Butler and stepdaughter of Alan Samuel Butler, chairman of the De Havilland Aircraft Company. A fellow architecture student, her social background was similar to Ventris's: her family was well-to-do, she had travelled in Europe, and she was interested in architecture. She was also popular and very beautiful.

Ventris did not complete his architecture studies, being conscripted in 1942. He chose the Royal Air Force (RAF). His preference was for navigator rather than pilot, and he completed the extensive training in the UK and Canada, to qualify early in 1944 and be commissioned. While training, he studied Russian intensively for several weeks, the purpose of which is not clear. He took part in the bombing of Germany, as aircrew on the Handley Page Halifax with No. 76 Squadron RAF, initially at RAF Breighton and then at RAF Holme-on-Spalding Moor. After the conclusion of the war, he served out the rest of his term on the ground in Germany, for which he was chosen because of his knowledge of Russian. His duties are unclear. His friends assumed he was on intelligence duties, interpreting his denials as part of a legal gag. No evidence of such assignments has emerged in the decades since. There is also no evidence that he was ever part of any code-breaking unit, as was Chadwick, even though the public has readily believed this explanation of his genius and success with Linear B.

Architect and palaeographer

After the war he worked briefly in Sweden, learning enough Swedish to communicate with scholars. Then he came home to complete his architectural education with honours in 1948 and settled down with Lois working as an architect. He designed schools for the Ministry of Education. He and his wife personally designed their family home, 19 North End, Hampstead. Ventris and his wife had two children, a son, Nikki (1942–1984) and a daughter, Tessa (born 1946).

Ventris continued with his efforts on Linear B, discovering in 1952 that it was an archaic form of Greek.

Decipherment
At the beginning of the 20th century, archaeologist Arthur Evans began excavating an ancient site at Knossos, on the island of Crete. In doing so he uncovered a great many clay tablets inscribed with two unknown scripts, Linear A and Linear B. Evans attempted to decipher both in the following decades, with little success.

In 1936, Evans hosted an exhibition on Cretan archaeology at Burlington House in London, home of the Royal Academy. It was the jubilee anniversary (50 years) of the British School of Archaeology in Athens, contemporaneous owners and managers of the Knossos site. Evans had given the site to them some years previously. Villa Ariadne, Evans's home there, was now part of the school. Boys from Stowe school were in attendance at one lecture and tour conducted by Evans himself at age 85. Ventris, 14 years old, was present and remembered Evans walking with a stick. The stick was undoubtedly the cane named Prodger which Evans carried all his life to assist him with his short-sightedness and night blindness. Evans held up tablets of the unknown scripts for the audience to see. During the interview period following the lecture, Ventris immediately confirmed that Linear B was as yet undeciphered, and determined to decipher it.

In 1940, the 18-year-old Ventris had an article "Introducing the Minoan Language" published in the American Journal of Archaeology. Ventris's initial theory was that Etruscan and Linear B were related and that this might provide a key to decipherment. Although this proved incorrect, it was a link he continued to explore until the early 1950s.

Shortly after Evans died, Alice Kober noted that certain words in Linear B inscriptions had changing word endings – perhaps declensions in the manner of Latin or Greek. Using this clue, Ventris constructed a series of grids associating the symbols on the tablets with consonants and vowels. While which consonants and vowels these were remained mysterious, Ventris learned enough about the structure of the underlying language to begin guessing. Kober was a classics professor at Brooklyn College and had done extensive work on Linear B. Ventris acknowledged her work as having made a significant contribution to his own work.

Shortly before World War II, American archaeologist Carl Blegen discovered a further 600 or so tablets of Linear B in the Mycenaean palace of Pylos on the Greek mainland. Photographs of these tablets by archaeologist Alison Frantz facilitated Ventris's later decipherment of the Linear B script.

In 1948 Sir John Myres invited a group of academics to help him transcribe Linear B material. Amongst them were Dr. Kober and Ventris. Although they did not collaborate further, Kober's work was essential in providing the foundational understanding from which Ventris built his theories on Linear B.

On 1 July 1952, Ventris announced his preliminary findings on a BBC radio talk which was heard by John Chadwick, a Classicist at University of Cambridge who had been involved in code breaking at Bletchley Park during the Second World War. The two men began to collaborate on further research into deciphering Linear B. In 1953 further Linear B tablets were discovered at ancient Mycenae and ancient Pylos on the Greek mainland, with one of the tablets showing a pictographic tripod cauldrons which matched the symbols in Linear B, as translated by Ventris and Chadwick. This led to wider international collaboration with other classical scholars and between 1953 and 1956 Ventris and Chadwick published joint papers. Comparing the Linear B tablets discovered on the Greek mainland, and noting that certain symbol groups appeared only in the Cretan texts, Ventris made the inspired guess that those were place names on the island. This proved to be correct. Armed with the symbols he could decipher from this, Ventris soon unlocked much of the text and determined that the underlying language of Linear B, a syllabic script, was in fact Greek. This overturned Evans's theories of Minoan history by establishing that Cretan civilization, at least in the later periods associated with the Linear B tablets, had been part of Mycenean Greece.

Death and legacy
Ventris was awarded an OBE in 1955 for "services to Mycenaean paleography."

In 1956 Ventris, who lived in Hampstead, died instantly in a late-night collision in Hatfield, Hertfordshire, with a parked truck while driving home, aged 34. The coroner's verdict was accidental death. In 1959 he was posthumously awarded the British Academy's Kenyon Medal.

An English Heritage blue plaque commemorates Ventris at his home in Hampstead and a street in Heraklion, the capital of the Greek island of Crete, was named in his honor.

A crater on the far side of the moon was named by in his honor by the IAU in 1970.

Bibliography
Ventris, M. G. F. Introducing the Minoan Language, essay article in American Journal of Archaeology XLIV/4 October–December 1940.
 
 
 
 
 Ventris, Michael The Journal of Hellenic Studies Volume LXXVI 1956 p. 146 Review of two Russian language works by V. I. Georgiev.

See also
 Emmett Bennett

References

Further reading

External links
 
 
 

1922 births
1956 deaths
English classical scholars
English people of Polish descent
English philologists
Architects from Hertfordshire
Royal Air Force personnel of World War II
People educated at Stowe School
Scholars of Mycenaean Greek
Hellenic epigraphers
Road incident deaths in England
20th-century English architects
Officers of the Order of the British Empire
British expatriates in Switzerland